The Kärntner Liga is the fourth highest division in Austrian football for clubs in the area of the province of Carinthia and the East Tyrol region, that belong to the Carinthian Football Association (KFV). Below the Kärntner Liga are the Unterliga West and Unterliga Ost.

Mode
The Carinthian League is organized as a league system competition in which, since 2003/04, in principle 16 teams participate (previously there were usually 14 teams, in 2002/03 15). The game is played in 30 championship rounds, each divided into a home and away round. The games and venues are drawn at the beginning of the season. The champions acquired the title Kärnter Landesmeister and are given the right to a promotion into the Austrian Regional League Central.

2020–21 member clubs 

SVG Bleiburg
SV Dellach/Gail
SV Feldkirchen
ATUS Ferlach
ASKÖ Gmünd
SV Hirter Kraig
KAC 1909
SAK Klagenfurt
ASKÖ Köttmannsdorf
FC Lendorf
SK Maria Saal
SV St. Jakob im Rosental
ASKÖ St. Michael ob Bleiburg
SK Treibach
VST Völkermarkt
ATSV Wolfsberg

External links
 Official Website
 Ligaportal Website

References

Football competitions in Austria